Differential pair may refer to:

 A pair of conductors used in differential signalling
 Long-tailed pair, a two-transistor circuit in a differential amplifier